The redside dace (Clinostomus elongatus) is a species of ray-finned fish in the family Cyprinidae, found in the United States and Canada. It is unique among minnows, being the only species to routinely feed on flying insects by leaping from water. Thus, it acts as a conduit for nutrient transfers between terrestrial and aquatic environments. The species can be used as an ecosystem health indicator, as it is sensitive to environmental disturbances.

Taxonomy
American naturalist Jared Potter Kirtland described the redside dace in 1840.

Distribution

United States
The species is most abundant in Pennsylvania, especially in the upper parts of the Susquehanna River drainage. It is also found in the streams of all the Great Lakes, as well as in the Ohio River and the upper parts of the Mississippi River drainage.

Canada
The distribution of redside dace is mainly limited to Southern Ontario, the Two Tree River on the St. Joseph Island being the only exception. Most populations have been identified in the streams draining into the western part of Lake Ontario, from the Pringle Creek near Oshawa to the Spencer Creek near Hamilton, Ontario. Smaller populations exist in the drainages of Lake Simcoe (Holland River system), Lake Erie (Irvine Creek), Berczy Creek in Markham and Lake Huron (Saugeen River system).

Description
The redside dace is brightly coloured, with a wide red stripe extending from the head to the dorsal fin, running along the middle of the body. Above it, a bright yellow stripe extends from head to tail. Colours are the brightest during spring, gradually fading during late summer and fall. Distinguishing it from other cyprinids, the species has a very large mouth and protruding lower jaw, which is an effective adaptation for capturing prey from below. The species' maximum length is 12 cm. The lifespan is no longer than four years.

It has longer and more slender body with brighter red coloration on its sides than the similar rosyside dace.

Habitat
The species favours slow-moving, cool, and clear headwaters of river systems, with copious overhanging riparian vegetation, especially grasses, forbs, and low shrubs. A preferred stream features a succession of riffles, necessary for spawning, and pools, inhabited outside the breeding season.

Conservation status
Although globally secure, the species has dwindled in many areas of its range; some populations have been extirpated. The redside dace is listed as endangered in Indiana and as of February 20, 2009, also in Ontario, as threatened in Michigan, and as special concern in Wisconsin. The Committee on the Status of Endangered Wildlife in Canada lists it as endangered.

References

Clinostomus
Taxa named by Jared Potter Kirtland
Fish described in 1840
Freshwater fish of North America